The 2016 LINAFOOT was supposed to be the 2nd season of the LINAFOOT, the top Chadian league for association football clubs since its establishment in 2015. Gazelle were the defending champions. The season started on 28 July 2016. However, the championship was interrupted due financial difficulties, at the end of October.

Events

In January 2016 the FTFA decided not to organise playoff for the ligue relegation and promotion from lower division, due to lack of time and finances. Instead, new rules were applied: a) the club from N'Djamena which finished 5th in the previous championship will be relegated to lower division, and the champion of Ligue de Football de N’Djamena will replace it; b) the champions of the regional leagues (Abéché – Mongo – Sarh – Moundou – Doba – Bongor – Biltine – Amtiman – Koumra and Pala) will be promoted to the first division, meaning that the first division was supposed to have 16 clubs. However, due financial difficulties, championship was interrupted after only 5 rounds, and no Chadian clubs represented the country in continental competitions.

Teams

The following 6 clubs were competing in the 2016 LINAFOOT season (Zone de N'Djaména):

AS CotonTchad (N'Djamena)
Elect-Sport FC (N'Djamena)
Foullah Edifice FC (N'Djamena)
Gazelle FC (N'Djamena)
Renaissance FC (N'Djamena)
Tourbillon FC (N'Djamena)

Final standings

References 

Chad
Chad
Foo
Football leagues in Chad